Candy Reynolds (born March 24, 1955) is a former professional tennis player from the United States.

Career
During her career, Reynolds won the women's doubles title at the French Open in 1983 (partnering Rosalyn Fairbank). She was also a runner-up at the Australian Open in 1980 (partnering Ann Kiyomura), and at the French Open in 1981 (partnering Paula Smith).

Reynolds' career-high rankings were world No. 50 in singles (in May 1983) and No. 24 in doubles (in December 1986). Her best singles performance at a Grand Slam event came at the Australian Open in 1980, when she reached the quarterfinals. She won 26 doubles titles during her career between 1980 and 1988.

WTA career finals

Doubles: 49 (26–23)

External links

 
 
 

American female tennis players
French Open champions
1955 births
Living people
Grand Slam (tennis) champions in women's doubles
Tennis people from Tennessee
21st-century American women